Pokrovka is an urban-type settlement in Khartsyzk Municipality, Donetsk Raion in Donetsk Oblast of eastern Ukraine. Population:

Demographics
Native language as of the Ukrainian Census of 2001:
 Ukrainian 71.2%
 Russian 28.26%

References

Urban-type settlements in Donetsk Raion